iCore Virtual Accounts is free download OS level virtualization (container-based virtualization) for Microsoft Windows XP.

Program
The program  is an isolated virtual machine that runs on top of the existing hardware and operating system. It allows the user to create multiple virtual "accounts" (virtual machines) that can be easily created or deleted without affecting each other's state or the state of the core operating system.

Such machines create and capture the output of a virtual "account" inside a virtual disk. Only the changes to specific files and programs accessible to  that virtual account will be stored in the virtual disk attached to that account. One can install programs inside it that will be sandboxed from the entire system, existing only inside the virtual disk. Each virtual account has full dedicated PC functionality with its own processes, files, and applications. This is accomplished by using a virtualization layer in the kernel of the host OS.

In contrast, programs accessible to all users of the computer will be usable in the virtual accounts without taking up space there, but the settings and bookmarks for the users of that account will stay inside the virtual disk.

Technical overview
For every application and/or user, the program is an autonomous OS, with its own registry, process, files, services and so on.

Software from vendors can run inside a container without modification.

Version compatibility
As of December 20, 2010, iCore only supports Windows XP.

See also
Comparison of platform virtualization software
Operating system-level virtualization
Sandbox (computer security)

References

External links

Virtualization software